Heng Tai is a Macau football club, which plays in the city of Macau. They play in the Macau's first division, the Campeonato da 1ª Divisão do Futebol.

Achievements
Macau Championship: 0

References 

Football clubs in Macau
1986 establishments in Macau